A leadership election was held by the People's Justice Party (PKR) from 16 October 2010 until 25 November 2010. It was won by incumbent President of PKR, Wan Azizah Wan Ismail.

Timeline
16 October 2010 – Nominations open at 10:00 UTC and close at 18:00 UTC
20 October 2010 – Deadline for making objections to nomination papers
20 October 2010 – Deadline for withdrawals of nomination
24 October 2010 – Finalisation of nomination list 
31 October 2010 – Ballots of members open
25 November 2010 – Ballots of members close
28 November 2010 – Results announced

Central Executive Committee election results
[ Source]

President

Deputy President

Vice Presidents

Central Executive Committee Members

References

2010 elections in Malaysia
People's Justice Party leadership election
People's Justice Party leadership elections